Hilton Woods (born 10 September 1968) is a swimmer who represented the Netherlands Antilles. He competed at the 1984 Summer Olympics and the 1988 Summer Olympics. He won a bronze medal in the 50 metre freestyle at the 1987 Pan American Games.

References

External links
 

1968 births
Living people
Dutch Antillean male swimmers
Olympic swimmers of the Netherlands Antilles
Swimmers at the 1984 Summer Olympics
Swimmers at the 1988 Summer Olympics
Place of birth missing (living people)
Swimmers at the 1987 Pan American Games
Pan American Games bronze medalists for the Netherlands Antilles
Pan American Games medalists in swimming
Medalists at the 1987 Pan American Games